Rosebery Avenue is a major thoroughfare in the boroughs of Camden and Islington, Central London. It starts southwest from the intersection with Theobald's Road, Holborn, and ends northeast at St John Street, Clerkenwell. Finsbury Town Hall and Charles Rowan House are among properties located on this road.

References

Streets in the London Borough of Camden
Streets in the London Borough of Islington